Saif al-Adel (born Mohammed Salah al-Din Zaidan; April 11, 1960/63) is a former Egyptian colonel, explosives expert, who is widely believed to be the current de facto leader of Al-Qaeda. Adel is under indictment by the United States for bomb attacks on United States embassies in Tanzania & Kenya.

A 2023 United Nations report, citing member state intelligence, concluded that Saif al-Adel had been named de-facto leader of al-Qaeda but that he had not been formally proclaimed as its Emir due to "political sensitives" of the Afghan government in acknowledging the killing of Ayman Al-Zawahiri in Kabul and the "theological and operational" challenges posed by location of al-Adel in Iran.

According to the Egyptian authorities, the FBI information on Saif al-Adel confuses the biographies of two members of Al-Qaeda. The first, 'Mohammed Salah al-Din Zaidan', known as Saif al-Adel, an economy graduate, joined Al-Qaeda in 1991, but was never a member of the Egyptian Islamic Jihad. The other individual, 'Mohammed Ibrahim Makkawi', is a former Egyptian Special Forces Colonel and a former member of the Egyptian Islamic Jihad, who traveled to Afghanistan in 1987 after his release from prison, and later joined Al-Qaeda as a charter member. Al-Adel was a supervisor of Bin Laden's personal security and has been described as an "experienced professional soldier" within the Jihadist movement.

According to the indictment, Adel is a member of the majlis al shura of al-Qaeda and a member of its military committee. He has provided military and intelligence training to members of al-Qaeda and Egyptian Islamic Jihad in Afghanistan, Pakistan, and Sudan, and to anti-UN Somali tribes. It is possible that his trainees included the Somalis of the first Battle of Mogadishu in 1993. He established the al-Qaeda training facility at Ras Kamboni in Somalia near the Kenyan border.

Adel was accused of being involved with Egyptian Islamic Jihad and attempting to overthrow the Egyptian government in 1987. After the charges were dismissed, he left the country in 1988 to join the mujahideen in repelling the Soviet invasion of Afghanistan. He is believed to have traveled to southern Lebanon along with Abu Talha al-Sudani, Saif al-Islam al-Masri, Abu Ja`far al-Masri, and Abu Salim al-Masri, where he trained alongside Hezbollah Al-Hejaz.

In Khartoum, Sudan, Adel taught recruited militants how to handle explosives. Along with senior leaders Saeed al-Masri and Mahfouz Ould al-Walid, he is believed to have opposed the September 11 attacks in Al-Qaeda's Majlis al Shura two months prior to their execution.

Early life
It is believed that Saif al-Adel (which translates to "Sword of Justice") is a pseudonym. His real name is Mohammed Salah al-Din Zaidan. He was born around 1960 (the FBI claims 11 April). He joined the Egyptian Military around 1976 and became a Colonel in the Special Forces as an Explosives expert, possibly being trained in the Soviet Union. He fled Egypt in 1988 and reportedly made his way to Afghanistan, joining the relatively small but well funded (and mainly Egyptian and Saudi) Maktab al-Khidamat, which was the forerunner to al-Qaeda. He became a trainer in Explosives to new recruits, and would stay in Afghanistan after the war to train members of the newly formed Taliban. The leader of the Somali militant Islamist group al-Shabaab, Moktar Ali Zubeyr, has said that Saif al-Adel and Yusef al-Ayeri played an important role in the 1993 Battle of Mogadishu by providing training and participating in the battle directly. Adel would later join Bin Laden in Sudan after 1994.

Militant connections

Embassy bombings 
Several months before the 1998 embassy bombings, Adel was helping Osama bin Laden move his followers from Najim Jihad to Tarnak Farms. The group had begrudgingly agreed to care for the troublesome Canadian 16-year-old, Abdurahman Khadr, since his father was away and his mother couldn't control his drinking, smoking and violent outbursts. However, while they were in Kabul, bin Laden asked Adel to take Abdurahman to the bus station and send him back to his family's home.

In approximately 2000, Adel was living in the Karte Parwan district of Kabul. On the local walkie-talkie communications in the city, he was identified as #1. On 9 September 2001, Adel was approached by Feroz Ali Abbasi, who said he was so impressed by the killing of Ahmed Shah Massoud that he wanted to volunteer for something similar.

In early November 2001, the Taliban government announced they were bestowing official Afghan citizenship on Adel, as well as Bin Laden, Zawahiri, Mohammed Atef, and Shaykh Asim Abdulrahman. During the American bombardment of Kandahar, Adel was present and witnessed the deaths of Abu-Ali al-Yafi'i and his wife, Abu-Usamah al-Ta'zi with his wife and two children, the wife of Rayyan al-Ta'zi, the wife of Abu-Usamah al-Kini, and the wife of Al-Barra al-Hijazi who was arrested in Morocco before the Casablanca bombings.

On 18 November, Adel was working with Abu-Muhammad al-Abyad, Abd-al-Rahman al-Masri, and Abu-Usamah al-Filastini, Abu-Husayn al-Masri and Faruq al-Suri; all of whom were staying in his empty house with him at night. In the early morning hours of 19 November, he woke them up just minutes before the al-Wafa charity building was bombed. Phoning friends in the area, he learned that Abdul Wahid had been killed in the explosion. He later learned that Asim al-Yamani, from Al Farouq training camp, and the elderly Abu-Abd-al-Rahman Al-Abiy had run to the charity's headquarters and begun rescuing survivors and pulling out the dead bodies. The pair agreed the area was not safe, and sent their women to the smaller villages, while they used their two cars to try and pack up their house's contents. An American jet bombed the pair, killing al-Yamani and wounding al-Abiy.

As it was the third day of Ramadan, the group in Adel's house began to prepare and eat Suhoor, but were interrupted by a cruise missile striking 100 metres away, destroying an empty house belonging to an Afghan Arab family, and a Taliban barracks. They gathered their belongings and quickly left, fearing another strike. Adel went to the hospital, where he visited the wounded al-Abiy, and arranged for him to be transferred to a hospital in Pakistan.

After Adel was told by Abu Ali al-Suri that the American aircraft had machinegunned women leaving the city on the road to Banjway, Adel said that he would send aid. A convoy of 4–6 Corolla Fielders set out to Banjway, followed closely by American helicopters. The Americans attacked the lead vehicle, killing Abu-Ali al-Yafi'i, his wife, four women, and two children, and the second vehicle, killing Suraqah al-Yamani and Hamzah al-Suri. Abu-Ali al-Maliki quickly veered off the road with the third vehicle, turning off his headlights, and drove into the mountains, escaping the attack.

Since al-Qaeda's military chief Mohammed Atef was killed in 2001, journalists reported that Adel was likely his successor in that role.

Pearl kidnapping
Since 2011, he has been connected with the kidnapping of the journalist Daniel Pearl in 2002.

2003 Riyadh bombing
Al-Adel and Saad bin Laden were implicated in the 12 May 2003 suicide bombing in Riyadh, Saudi Arabia. In May 2003, then-State Department official Ryan Crocker provided information on the upcoming attack to Iranian officials, who apparently took no action. However, according to Saad's family and an interrogation of former al-Qaeda spokesman Sulaiman Abu Ghaith, Saad and al-Adel were being held prisoner in Iran when the attack took place. In 2004, he published a "terrorist manual" entitled The Base of the Vanguard, an Arabic pun on the phrases al-Qaeda ("the base") and the Vanguards of Conquest.

Al-Adel was a key source in a 2005 book on al-Qaeda's global strategy by the journalist Fouad Hussein.

Al-Adel is a leader of al-Qaeda in Iran, according to American security expert Seth Jones.

Current location
Adel has been on the FBI's list of Most Wanted Terrorists since its inception in 2001. The State Department's Rewards for Justice Program is offering up to US$10 million for information on his location.

In late 2001, Adel fled Afghanistan to Iran and was detained under house arrest in Tehran. Later reports indicated that he was released by Iran in March 2010 in exchange for the release of Heshmatollah Attarzadeh, an Iranian diplomat kidnapped in November 2008, and made his way to northern Pakistan. Although Mahfouz Ould al-Walid was reported killed in a January 2002 American airstrike, it was later revealed that he fled to Iran with Adel.

In October 2010, Der Spiegel reported that Adel was in the Waziristan region in the Federally Administered Tribal Areas between Northwest Frontier Province, Pakistan and Afghanistan.

In July 2011, it was reported that Adel returned to Iran.

Egyptian authorities reported in 2012 that he was arrested at the Cairo International Airport upon his return to Egypt from Pakistan via the United Arab Emirates. However, according to Ghaith, al-Adel never left Iran and was still under house arrest when Ghaith was captured in 2013.

On 20 September 2015, Al Arabiya reported that al-Adel and four other captives were part of a prisoner exchange Iranian authorities made with Al Qaida in the Arabian Peninsula in Yemen.

On 16 March 2016, a Twitter account affiliated with al-Qaeda implicated al-Adel as having been sent to aid against the Russian intervention in the Syrian Civil War. A similar report also placed al-Adel as having been sent to Syria as an emissary on behalf of al-Qaeda emir Ayman al-Zawahiri. However, Long War Journal claims that al-Adel is still residing in Iran.

On August 2, 2022, a day after it was reported that al-Zawahiri was killed in a U.S. drone strike, al-Adel was still reported to be in Iran, which also complicated his ability to succeed al-Zawahiri as Al Qaeda's leader. NPR journalist Colin P. Clarke described al-Adel's legal status in Iran as "semi-house arrest." In February 2023, a report from the United Nations, based on member state intelligence, concluded that de-facto leadership of Al-Qaeda had passed to Saif al-Adel, who was operating out of Iran.

Real name
It was originally believed that his real name is Mohammed Ibrahim Makkawi. However, on 29 February 2012, Egyptian authorities arrested a man by that name at Cairo International Airport and it was discovered that he was not Adel. Adel's real name is instead Mohammed Salah al-Din Zaidan.

Writings

In February 2006, the Combating Terrorism Center at West Point published a number of declassified documents from the Harmony database, some of which are known or believed to have been written by Saif al-Adel. One is a letter signed "Omar al-Sumali, previously known as Saif al-Adel", about the author's activities in southern Somalia during UNOSOM II (1993–1995). It identifies Ras Kamboni as a suitable site for an al-Qaeda base. It mentions an accomplice of Adel called "Mukhtar".

In a letter from "'Abd-al-Halim Adl'" to "'Mukhtar'", dated 13 June 2002, the author strongly criticises the leadership of Osama bin Laden, blaming the defeats of the preceding six months for al-Qaeda on bin Laden's recklessness and unwillingness to listen to advice:

 
From the following section, the 2002 addressee, "'Mukhtar'" appears to be Khalid Sheikh Mohammed, the commander of the September 11, 2001 attacks:

The East Asia, Europe, America, Horn of Africa, Yemen, Gulf, and Morocco groups have fallen, and Pakistan has almost been drowned in one push. I, not to mention the other individuals who have also moved and fallen, have often advised on this matter. Regrettably, my brother, if you look back, you will find that you are the person solely responsible for all this because you undertook the mission, and during six months, we only lost what we built in years.

In 2004, Adel was alleged to be the author of The Al-Battar Military Camp, a manual that advised prospective militants about how to strike easy targets.

On 11 March 2005, Al-Quds Al-Arabi published extracts from Adel's document, "Al Quaeda's Strategy to the Year 2020". In his May 2005 correspondence to Deputy Emir Ayman al-Zawhiri, Saif al-Adel outlined the key pillars in Al-Qaeda's revolutionary strategy: 

 Decisive Jihadist activities that precisely delineates goals and targets. The ultimate objective is the revival of "Islamic way of life by means of establishing the state of Islam". This endeavor has to be supervised by qualified Islamic scholars (ulema)
 All decisions, objectives and policies should be based on the belief of Tawhid (Islamic monotheism)
 Every activity should be implemented on the basis of short-term and long-term strategic visions. Adel writes in his message to Zawahiri: "mujahidin should have short-term plans aimed at achieving interim goals and long-term plans aimed at accomplishing the greater objective, which is the establishment of a state."

March 2007, the Pentagon posted on the Internet a transcript of part of the hearing into the combatant status of detainee Ramzi bin al-Shibh. Some of the evidence against bin al-Shibh came from a diary of Saif al-Adel found in Saudi Arabia in 2004.

The CSRT document described al-Adel by the following:

Sayf al-Adel is a senior al Qaida military commander with a long-term relationship with Usama bin Laden. Sayf al-Adel's role in the organization has been as a trainer, military leader, and key member of Usama bin Laden's security detail.The diary of Sayf al-Adel was recovered during a raid in Saudi Arabia in 2004. The diary details the Detainee's involvement in the 11 September 2001 terrorist plot and subsequent attack.

In addition, the paragraph continued:

The Detainee is listed as a "highly professional jihadist" along with "9/11 hijackers", Mohammed Atta and Ziad Jarrah. The diary states that the three were briefed on an operation involving aircraft by Abu Hafs, a senior al Qaida planner.

In December 2010, Adel allegedly sent a series of five letters to Abu Walid al Masri, then under house arrest in Iran. He discusses the War in Afghanistan, criticises the religious failings of the mujahidin and hypocrisy of Islamic scholars, and the failure of the Jihadist movement to learn from previous mistakes. Al Masri posted the letters on the Internet in December 2010. In March 2011, Adel allegedly released another five letters through al Masri, which covered the Arab Spring uprisings.

In August 2015, a eulogy written by al-Adel for Abu Khalid al Suri, an al-Qaeda veteran who served as both a senior figure in the Syrian opposition group Ahrar al-Sham and as Ayman al Zawahiri's representative in Syria, was released. In the eulogy he criticized the Islamic State and described them as having "twisted" and "perverted" thoughts.

Personal life
He is married to the daughter of Mustafa Hamid; they have five children.

See also 
List of fugitives from justice who disappeared

References

External links
 
 

1960s births
20th-century criminals
Al-Qaeda leaders
Egyptian al-Qaeda members
Egyptian Islamic Jihad
Egyptian mass murderers
FBI Most Wanted Terrorists
Fugitives
Individuals designated as terrorists by the United States government
Living people
Qutbism
Egyptian Qutbists
People from Monufia Governorate
Salafi jihadists
Year of birth uncertain